Bowman's Hill Wildflower Preserve is a 134-acre nature preserve, botanical garden, and accredited museum located at 1635 River Road (Pennsylvania Route 32), New Hope, Pennsylvania. It is open daily, except for major holidays, April–June, and closed on Tuesdays July–March; an admission fee is charged to nonmembers.  A non-profit organization, Bowman's Hill Wildflower Preserve Association Inc., maintains the park in accordance to a management agreement with the Pennsylvania Department of Conservation and Natural Resources and the Pennsylvania Historical and Museum Commission.

Today, the preserve contains over 700 of the 2,000 plant species native to Pennsylvania and the Delaware Valley, growing in a naturalistic setting of woodlands, meadows, ponds and Pidcock Creek, with about 4.5 miles of walking trails. It is an excellent site for bird-watching.

Mission

The mission of Bowman's Hill Wildflower Preserve is to lead people to a greater appreciation of native plants, to an understanding of their importance to all life, and to a commitment to the preservation of a healthy and diverse natural world.

History

The preserve was established in 1934 within the Washington Crossing Historic Park at the site where George Washington's army camped during the American Revolutionary War. Just five miles south of the preserve, Washington and his men crossed the Delaware River to fight and win the Battle of Trenton in 1776.

Climate

According to the Trewartha climate classification system, Bowman's Hill Wildflower Preserve has a Temperate Continental climate (Dc) with hot summers (a), cold winters (o) and year-around precipitation. Dcao climates are characterized by at least one month having an average mean temperature ≤ , four to seven months with an average mean temperature ≥ , at least one month with an average mean temperature ≥  and no significant precipitation difference between seasons. Although most summer days are slightly humid at Bowman's Hill Wildflower Preserve, episodes of heat and high humidity can occur with heat index values > . The average wettest month is July which corresponds with the annual peak in thunderstorm activity. Since 1981, the wettest calendar day was 7.07 inches (180 mm) on 08/27/2011. Episodes of extreme cold and wind can occur with wind chill values < . The average annual snowfall (Nov-Apr) is between 24 and 30 inches (61 and 76 cm), and the average snowiest month is February which corresponds with the peak in nor'easter activity.

Ecology

According to the A. W. Kuchler U.S. potential natural vegetation types, Bowman's Hill Wildflower Preserve would have a dominant vegetation type of Appalachian Oak (104) with a dominant vegetation form of Eastern hardwood forest (25).

See also 
 List of botanical gardens in the United States
 List of museums in Pennsylvania
 Bowman's Hill Tower

References

External links 

 Bowman's Hill Wildflower Preserve

Botanical gardens in Pennsylvania
Protected areas of Bucks County, Pennsylvania
Institutions accredited by the American Alliance of Museums